James Arthur "Bob" Hatch (November 22, 1879 – July 25, 1944) was an American football coach.  He served as the head football coach at Colgate University for one season in 1903, compiling a record of 4–2–1. Hatch also served as the head football coach at his alma mater, Williams College, for one season in 1906.

Head coaching record

References

External links
 

1879 births
1944 deaths
American football tackles
Colgate Raiders football coaches
Williams Ephs football coaches
Williams Ephs football players
People from Chittenango, New York